Anneli Ott (born 2 May 1976) is an Estonian politician. She served as Minister of Culture in the cabinet of Prime Minister Kaja Kallas.

She previously served as Minister of Public Administration in the second cabinet of Jüri Ratas.

References 

1976 births
21st-century Estonian politicians
21st-century Estonian women politicians
Estonian Centre Party politicians
Living people
Members of the Riigikogu, 2015–2019
Members of the Riigikogu, 2019–2023
Ministers of Culture of Estonia
Politicians from Tartu
University of Tartu alumni
Women government ministers of Estonia
Women members of the Riigikogu